Walter Howard Evans (April 17, 1870 – July 13, 1959) was a judge of the United States Customs Court.

Education and career

Born on April 17, 1870, in New Middletown, Indiana, Evans received a Bachelor of Science degree in 1899 from Valparaiso University. He received a Bachelor of Laws in 1905 from the University of Oregon School of Law, then located in Portland, Oregon. He taught public school in Oregon from 1886 to 1898. He was a clerk for the United States Army Quartermaster Department stationed in Puerto Rico from 1898 to 1905. He was an Assistant United States Attorney for the District of Oregon from 1908 to 1912. He was a state district attorney in the Fourth Judicial District of Oregon from 1912 to 1921. He served as a Circuit Court Judge for the Fourth Judicial District of Oregon from 1921 to 1931.

Federal Judicial Service

Evans was nominated by President Herbert Hoover on January 28, 1931, to a seat on the United States Customs Court vacated by Judge Byron Sylvester Waite. He was confirmed by the United States Senate on February 14, 1931, and received his commission on February 23, 1931. His service terminated on May 31, 1941, due to his retirement. He was succeeded by Judge William A. Ekwall.

Death

Evans died on July 13, 1959, in Portland.

References

Sources

External links
 

1870 births
1959 deaths
Judges of the United States Customs Court
People from Indiana
Valparaiso University alumni
University of Oregon alumni
Educators from Oregon
Oregon state court judges
District attorneys in Oregon
United States Army officers
United States Article I federal judges appointed by Herbert Hoover
20th-century American judges
Assistant United States Attorneys